This is a list of mayors of Colmar in Alsace.

1789 - 1790 : Daniel Adam Eggerle
1790 - 1792 : Etienne Ignace de Salomon
1792 - 1795 : Nicolas Sébastien Simon
1795 - 1795 : André Rockenstroh
1795 - 1799 : Emmanuel Mussel
1799 - 1800 : Jean Buob
1800 - 1813 : Marx Anton Richert
1813 - 1815 : Dr Gabriel Louis François Anaclet Morel
1815 - 1816 : Jean Buob
1816 - 1817 : Jean Philibert de Minangoy
1817 - 1830 : baron Jean Chrysostôme Louis de Muller
1830 - 1841 : Dr Gabriel Louis François Anaclet Morel
1841 - 1855 : Charles Joseph Chappuis
1855 - 1877 : Marie Hercule Jean-Baptiste de Peyerimhoff
1877 - 1877 : Wilhelm Grote (Bürgermeisterverwalter)
1877 - 1877 : Adalbert von Neumann (Bürgermeisterverwalter)
1877 - 1879 : Hermann Ernst Julius Keetmann (Bürgermeisterverwalter)
1879 - 1880 : baron Friedrich von Reichlin-Meidegg (Bürgermeisterverwalter)
1880 - 1896 : Camille Schlumberger
1896 - 1898 : Jean Baptiste Victor Fleurent
1898 - 1905 : Auguste Riegert
1905 - 1914 : Daniel Blumenthal
1914 - 1918 : Friedrich Dieffenbach
1918 - 1918 : Max Lehmann
1918 - 1918 : Jean-Georges Baer
1918 - 1922 : Antoine François Conrath
1922 - 1929 : Charles Sengel
1929 - 1935 : Eugène Hertzog
1935 - 1940 : Jacques Edouard Richard
1940 - 1944 : Luzian Manny (Oberstadtkommissar)
1944 - 1945 : Karl Schmidt (Oberbürgermeister)
1945 - 1945 : Karl Hellstern (Stadtkommissar)
1945 - 1947 : Jacques Edouard Richard
1947 - 1977 : Joseph Rey
1977 - 1995 : Edmond Gerrer
1995 - 2020 : Gilbert Meyer
2020–present : Éric Straumann

References

Colmar, mayors
Colmar